Rockfish is a common type of fish, actually of many species.

Rockfish may also refer to:

Geography
 Rockfish, North Carolina, United States, a census-designated place
 Rockfish Township, Cumberland County, North Carolina, a former township
 Rockfish Creek (Cape Fear River tributary), North Carolina
 Rockfish, Virginia, United States, an unincorporated community
 Rockfish River, Blue Ridge Mountains, Virginia
 Rockfish Gap, Blue Ridge Mountains, Virginia, a wind gap

Other uses
 A nickname of Jim Rockford, the protagonist of the TV drama The Rockford Files
 Rockfish Games, a video game publisher; see, for example, Everspace

See also
 Rock Phish, a type of computer malware